Camas Creek is a  long stream in southeastern Idaho, United States, that is a tributary of Mud Lake.

Description
Beginning at an elevation of  near Kilgore in northeastern Clark County, it flows southwest into Jefferson County and receives its largest tributary, Beaver Creek. Camas Creek has a  watershed.

See also

 List of rivers of Idaho

References

External links

Rivers of Clark County, Idaho
Rivers of Jefferson County, Idaho
Rivers of Idaho